City Park Mall is a large shopping mall located in Constanța, Romania. The center includes over 200 stores and a multiplex with eight screens.

References

Shopping malls in Constanța